Hilda Sehested (27  April 1858 – 15 April 1936) was a Danish composer.

Biography
Hilda Sehested was born in Funen, Denmark, of parents Niels Frederik Bernhard Sehested (1813–82), an archeologist, and Charlotte Christine Linde (1819–94). She studied music with C. F. E. Horneman in Copenhagen and later with  Louise Aglaé Massart (1827-1887) in Paris. She studied organ with Ludvig Birkedal-Barfod and composition with Orla Rosenhoff, and began composing at the age of 30.

Sehested's mother died in 1894, and she moved to Copenhagen to live with her sister Thyra. She became engaged to archaeologist and museum director Henry Petersen there, but he died before the wedding. Shocked by his death, Sehested took a job as a nurse for a while and then as a church organist, and eventually returned to composing. She died in Copenhagen.

Works
Sehested wrote a number of songs, compositions for instruments and orchestra and one opera. Selected works include:

Fantasy Pieces, 1891
Sonata for Pianoforte, 1896
Intermezzi for Piano Trio, sonata, 1904
Suite für Cornet in B und Klavier, 1905
Songs with Piano, 1907
Agnete and the Merman opera, 1914
Miniatures for Orchestra, 1915
Rhapsody, 1915
Quartet in G for strings
Morceau pathétique for trombone and orchestra, 1923
Four Fantasy Pieces for flute and piano, 1927

Her compositions have been recorded and issued on CD, including;
Romantic Piano Works by Danish Women Composers Cathrine Penderup, Nanna Liebmann, Hilda Sehested, Benna Moe (2009) Danacord Records

References

1858 births
1936 deaths
19th-century classical composers
20th-century classical composers
Danish classical composers
Women classical composers
Danish opera composers
Women opera composers
Danish women composers
19th-century Danish composers
20th-century women composers
19th-century women composers